Minter is an unincorporated community in Dallas County, Alabama, United States.  Minter has one site included on the National Register of Historic Places, the Street Manual Training School.

References

Unincorporated communities in Alabama
Unincorporated communities in Dallas County, Alabama